The Bréguet 390T, 392T and 393T were a family of French propeller-driven sesquiplane airliners of the mid-1930s.

Development
The Bréguet 390T family were large three-engine sesquiplanes of all-metal construction with a fixed tailwheel undercarriage.

Operational history
The newly constituted Air France operated six 393Ts, plus the sole 392T prototype that it purchased from Breguet to use as a cargo plane. The aircraft were originally deployed on the Toulouse-Casablanca route and later on the Natal-Buenos Aires route. Towards the end of their careers, all remaining 393Ts were recalled to Paris and used on short routes between Paris and nearby European destinations.

Variants
390T
First prototype, powered by Gnome-Rhône 5Kd radial engines. One aircraft built, destroyed in crash early in test programme.
391T
Second prototype, similar to 390T.
392T
Freighter version powered by Hispano-Suiza 9Qc radial engines, one built.
393T
Definitive production version with Gnome-Rhône 7Kd radial engines, six built.

Operators

Air France

Specifications (393T)

References

Citations

Bibliography
 
 

1930s French airliners
 0393T
Sesquiplanes
Trimotors
Aircraft first flown in 1931